Mid-Channel is a 1920 American silent drama film based on the 1909 play of the same name written by Sir Arthur Wing Pinero. The film was produced and directed by Harry Garson and stars Clara Kimball Young. On Broadway the play starred Ethel Barrymore.

Plot
As described in a film magazine, Zoe (Young) and Theodore Blundell (Glendon) have reached that period of married life when parties become monotonous to each other and find petty fault, forgetting the love of former years. Zoe yearns for children, and earlier in their married life they agreed to not have children until their financial status had improved. Now that they are wealthy they are forever at odds and rarely in each other's company. They quarrel and Zoe goes to her room and reads Pinero's Mid-Channel. As Theodore is always busy, Zoe seeks diversion in the company of faithful friends, among whom are Theodore's partner Peter Mottram (Kimball) and Leonard Ferris (Grassby). Zoe's friend Mrs. Pierpont (Robinson) makes every effort to match her daughter Ethel (Griffith) with Leonard, and at first all seems to go smoothly. As the rupture between Zoe and Theodore reaches the breaking point, Zoe turns to Leonard for sympathy. The Blundells finally separate, and Zoe goes abroad. Theodore meets the designing widow Mrs. Annerly (Sullivan) who wins him. Zoe hears of that relationship and in despair turns to Leonard. After many months Zoe returns home and Leonard tells he to see her attorneys. She still loves her husband and Leonard is becoming somewhat of a bore, but she sees them anyway. Theodore, in the meantime, has broken up with Mrs. Annerly. Peter at this critical point attempts to patch things up between Zoe and Theodore. Theodore confesses to Zoe his relations with Mrs. Annerly. When Zoe confesses hers with Leonard, the reconciliation is cut short. Zoe goes to Leonard, who by this time has become engaged to Ethel. Forsaken by everyone, Zoe jumps out of a window to her death. The film then cuts back, and Zoe is seen shutting the book that contained the story she has been acting out in her mind. She goes to her husband and they work on a reconciliation.

Cast
 Clara Kimball Young as Zoe Blundell
 J. Frank Glendon as Theodore Blundell
 Edward Kimball as Honorable Peter Mottram
 Bertram Grassby as Leonard Ferris
 Eileen Robinson as Mrs. Pierpont
 Helene Sullivan as Mrs. Annerly
 Katherine Griffith as Ethel Pierpont
 Jack Livingston as Claude Roberts
 Frank Coghlan Jr. (uncredited)

Survival status
The film has been released on DVD.

References

External links

 
 
 Lobby card at stanford.edu

1920 films
American silent feature films
American films based on plays
1920 drama films
Silent American drama films
American black-and-white films
Films directed by Harry Garson
1920s American films